Roush Fenway Keselowski Racing, doing business as RFK Racing, is an American professional stock car organization that currently competes in the NASCAR Cup Series. One of NASCAR's largest racing teams in the 2000s and early 2010s, Roush formerly ran teams in the NASCAR Xfinity Series, NASCAR Camping World Truck Series, ARCA Menards Series, Trans-Am Series and IMSA Camel GT. The team currently fields the No. 6 Ford Mustang GT full-time for driver/co-owner Brad Keselowski and the No. 17 Mustang full-time for Chris Buescher.

The team was originally Roush Racing and was renamed Roush Fenway Racing in 2007 when John W. Henry and the Fenway Sports Group became co-owners and RFK Racing in 2022 when Brad Keselowski became a co-owner.

Since its inception, Roush has competed exclusively in Ford brand automobiles. The team also operates Roush-Yates Engines, which provides engines for most Ford teams in NASCAR and ARCA.

History
Roush Racing was founded by Jack Roush, former employee of the Ford Motor Company and founder of Roush Performance . Prior to entering NASCAR competition, Roush had competed and won championships in various drag racing and sports car racing series since the mid-1960s, including the NHRA, SCCA Trans-Am Series, IMSA GT Championship, and the 24 Hours of Daytona. The racing business was originally a small branch of co-owner Jack Roush's successful automotive engineering and road-racing equipment business based in Livonia, Michigan. Early Roush drivers included Tommy Kendall, Scott Pruett and Willy T. Ribbs.

The NASCAR operation, founded in 1988 and based in Concord, North Carolina, has since become the cornerstone and centerpiece of the company. The team won back to back Championships in the NASCAR Cup Series in 2003 and 2004; the final Winston Cup championship with driver Matt Kenseth, and the first Nextel Cup championship with driver Kurt Busch. The team also has amassed many wins and championships in the Nationwide/Xfinity Series and Craftsman Truck Series competition.

In 2007, sports investor John W. Henry, owner of the Fenway Sports Group which operates the Boston Red Sox, Liverpool F.C., and the New England Sports Network bought a 50% stake in the team, renamed Roush Fenway Racing. Jack Roush continues to head day-to-day operations of the team.

Roush restarted its road racing program in 2006, called Roush Road Racing (previously Roush Performance Racing or Roush Performance). The team fielded the No. 61 Ford Mustang in the IMSA Continental Tire Sports Car Challenge and Rolex Sports Car Series for Billy Johnson and Jack Roush's son, Jack Roush Jr., and since 2014 fields the No. 60 Mustang in the Pirelli World Challenge sponsored by Roush Performance and driven by Roush, Jr. Since 2015, the team has been fielded in a partnership with Capaldi Racing, moving from the Roush Fenway shops in North Carolina to Michigan near Roush Performance headquarters.

After several months of speculation, Roush-Fenway announced on July 20, 2021, at the NASCAR Hall of Fame that the 2010 Nationwide Series and 2012 Sprint Cup Series Champion Brad Keselowski would depart from Team Penske after the 2021 season to join the organization as a driver (replacing Ryan Newman in the No. 6) and co-owner.

Cup Series

 

 

Founded in 1988, the NASCAR program is built around having multiple cars and providing engine, engineering, and race car build services to other NASCAR teams fielding Ford-branded vehicles. The multi-team aspect of the company allows for information and resources to be shared across the enterprise, improving the performance of all of the teams. Since the 2004 season, engines for the cars have been provided by Roush-Yates Engines, a partnership between Roush Fenway Racing and now-closed rival Yates Racing, with Doug Yates as a head engine builder. Roush-Yates also provides engines, cars and parts to other Cup teams, including Wood Brothers Racing, Team Penske, Rick Ware Racing, Stewart Haas Racing, Front Row Motorsports, and Live Fast Motorsports.

Between 1998 and 2000 and 2003–2009, Roush Racing operated five full-time Cup teams (6, 16, 17, 26/97, 99), more than any other organization including Hendrick Motorsports and Richard Childress Racing, which have both operated as many as four full-time teams. Beginning in 2001, after years of operating in separate facilities, the teams were moved into a single shop in Concord, North Carolina to improve performance and communication. Roush Racing set a NASCAR record by putting all five of its race teams in the Chase for the Nextel Cup in 2005. Following the 2009 season, Roush Fenway was ordered by NASCAR to shrink its operation to four Sprint Cup Series teams, ceding the No. 26 team. The team would later shrink to three teams after the 2011 season, and would shrink again to two teams after the 2016 season.

Xfinity Series

The Xfinity Series operation began in 1992 with the No. 60 driven by Mark Martin. The No. 60 team has been dominant throughout its history, amassing many wins with Martin; three driver's championships with Greg Biffle in 2002, Carl Edwards in 2007, and Chris Buescher in 2015; and an owner's championship with Edwards in 2011. The No. 6 team won back-to-back driver's championships in 2011 & 2012 with Ricky Stenhouse Jr. Following the departures of Ryan Reed, Chase Briscoe, and Austin Cindric, Roush's Xfinity program was closed following the 2018 season.

Camping World Truck Series
From 1995 until 2009 Roush fielded teams in the NASCAR Truck Series, fielding trucks for drivers such as Kurt Busch, Greg Biffle, Kyle Busch, Carl Edwards, Ricky Craven, David Ragan, Mark Martin, Travis Kvapil, and various others. Many of these drivers went on to drive for the team at the Cup level. Roush's trucks won fifty races and the 2000 series championship (Biffle).

Truck No. 09 history
Chuck Hossfeld drove the final race of 2000 at California Speedway in the No. 49 as a third Roush entry in preparation to take over the No. 50 from Greg Biffle in the 2001 season. He finished 31st after losing an engine during the event.

The No. 33 truck began running in 2005 as a research and development entry for Ford. Bobby East attempted three races in the truck but failed to qualify for two of them. He crashed out of his only start at Phoenix, finishing 30th. Mark Martin ran the Ford 200, where he started 14th and finished 8th with sponsorship from Stonebridge Life Insurance.

Joey Clanton began the 2008 season driving the No. 09 full-time in 2008 with Zaxby's sponsoring, but after the season-opening race, he was released. Travis Kvapil returned to Roush and shared this ride with Bobby East and John Wes Townley for the rest of the season. Jamie McMurray piloted the truck at the fall Martinsville race. Kvapil managed two top-five finishes at Dover and New Hampshire during the season. Roush shut down the No. 09 team after the 2008 season.

Truck No. 09 results

Truck No. 6 history

Multiple drivers (2006)

The truck switched to No. 6 and was shared by Nextel Cup veteran Mark Martin and rookie David Ragan. The No. 6 truck's new sponsor was Scotts, and the truck, piloted by Martin, won the first two races of the 2006 season. Martin then decided to race more races than he originally intended, and he only skipped races without a corresponding Nextel Cup event. Auggie Vidovich II drove for the Mansfield race after Ragan crashed the truck in practice, finishing 19th. Ragan shared the truck with Martin for the balance of the season and had six top-tens and one pole in the 6 truck. Martin had the most success in the truck, winning five races. Overall, the team finished 2nd in the owner's points.

Travis Kvapil (2007)
In 2007, Mark Martin moved on to a new role with another team. In his place, Roush-Fenway hired 2003 NCTS Champion Travis Kvapil. Kvapil, after two years of struggling to launch his Cup Series career, returned to the Truck Series in 2007. During the season, Kvapil almost won the opening race at Daytona, and won four races en route to a sixth-place finish in points.

Colin Braun (2008–2009)

As Kvapil heads back to the Sprint Cup Series with Yates Racing, former Rolex Sports Car Series driver Colin Braun took Kvapil's place in the No. 6 truck with sponsorship from Con-way. In his rookie season, Braun had three top-fives and finished 13th in points, winning Rookie of the Year. In 2009, he won at Michigan and finished 5th in points. With moving Braun to the Nationwide Series for the 2010 season, Roush shut down this team and ended its Truck Series program. He later sold the remaining trucks to Cup Series driver Kyle Busch for him to start his own truck team.

Truck No. 6 results

Truck No. 50 history

Early Years (1995–1997)
The original truck in Roush's stable debuted in 1995 at the Heartland Park Topeka road course. It was No. 61 and driven to a fourth-place finish by Todd Bodine. Bodine had four more top ten runs before Ted Musgrave drove to a fourth-place finish at Phoenix. In 1996, the car switched to No. 80, and Joe Ruttman was at the wheel, nailing down sixteen top-10s and finishing 4th in points. In 1997, with sponsorship from LCI, Ruttman won five times and finished 3rd in points.

Greg Biffle (1998–2000)
For the first race in 1998 at Walt Disney World Speedway, Ruttman piloted the No. 50, rookie Greg Biffle drove the No. 80, and Chuck Bown ran the No. 99. After Bown departed the team, Ruttman took over the No. 99, and Biffle moved from the No. 80, which was discontinued, to the No. 50. Biffle had been hired by Roush under the recommendation of Benny Parsons, and he would be sponsored by W. W. Grainger. Although he failed to win a race, Biffle won four poles and finished eighth in points.

Biffle would go on a tear in 1999 when he won nine times and was in contention for the championship for much of the season before finally losing to Jack Sprague. His 2000 season was less dominant with only five wins, but he was able to win the championship by 230 points over teammate Kurt Busch.

Chuck Hossfield (2001)

With Biffle moving up to the Busch Series, in 2001, Roush hired Winston Modified Tour driver Chuck Hossfeld to drive the truck after he won 2000 Roush "Gong Show" competition. Hossfeld struggled in his rookie year, and soon he was released, with Jon Wood driving the truck for the remainder of the season.

Jon Wood (2001–2004)
Wood's audition was impressive enough to earn him a full-time run in 2002, and he posted twelve top-ten finishes in the U.S. Navy sponsored truck and finished 12th in points in his first full year. Wood had two wins the next year and finished 15th in points in 2004 before moving on to JTG Racing in the Busch Series.

Todd Kluever (2005)
In 2005, Todd Kluever, another "Gong Show" winner, piloted the truck sponsored by Shell Rotella T and World Financial Group. Kluever earned six top five and twelve top ten finishes in his rookie season, winning the Rookie of the Year award.

Multiple drivers (2006–2007)

After Martin's strong start to the 2006 season, his original limited schedule in the No. 6 was expanded. Roush decided to run another part-time team for rookie David Ragan to fill out his original schedule. Ragan took the No. 50 to a 22nd-place finish at Atlanta, but struggled in his next few starts in both the No. 50 and the No. 6. Carl Edwards ran the No. 50 at the Dover race, achieving the team's only top five of the season, and Ragan returned at the Michigan race. Ragan's best finish in the No. 50 came at Atlanta where he finished sixth. Peter Shepherd and Michel Jourdain Jr. also drove the No. 50 on a part-time basis during the season with sponsorship from PurposeMoney.com. Edwards drove the truck for the first two races of the 2007 season unsponsored, scoring the team's only top five of the season at California Speedway. It was then announced that T. J. Bell would drive the truck for sixteen races, bringing sponsorship from Heathcliff's Cat Litter. Development drivers Peter Shepherd, Danny O'Quinn Jr., and Colin Braun also drove the No. 50 truck, with sponsorship from Northern Tool and Equipment.

Truck No. 50 results

Truck No. 99 history

Early years (1996–2002)
The No. 99 truck debuted at Heartland Park Topeka in 1996. It was sponsored by Exide Batteries and driven to an eighth-place finish by Jeff Burton. Posting three top tens in four races that year, he shared the ride with Mark Martin, who won at North Wilkesboro Speedway. The next year, Chuck Bown was hired to drive full-time, posting thirteen top tens and finishing ninth in points. Bown drove the first race of the 1998 season at Walt Disney World Speedway, before Joe Ruttman moved over to the truck for the remainder of the year, winning once and finishing third in points. Mike Bliss was next to tackle the ride, scoring a win at Heartland Park Topeka but only finishing ninth in points. When Bliss left for an ill-fated rookie year in Winston Cup, Kurt Busch was named the new driver for 2000. Busch won four times and finished second to teammate Biffle in the championship, easily winning Rookie of the Year.

Both Busch and Exide exited after that season (Busch moving to the Cup Series), and rookie Nathan Haseleu took over. The truck was largely unsponsored at the beginning of the year, with Eldon becoming the sponsor after nine races. Despite posting four top ten finishes in twelve starts, Hasleau was waived mid-season, replaced initially by former Truck Series drivers Greg Biffle and Kurt Busch. Biffle scored two wins in the truck. Kurt's younger brother Kyle would also run six races in the second half of the season, earning two top tens at the age of 16. Kyle Busch was scheduled to race the truck full-time in 2002, but during the 2001 season finale at Fontana he was ejected from the race due to conflicts with track sponsor Marlboro. Afterwards, NASCAR announced all drivers in its top three series must be at least 18 years of age. Tim Woods III would replace Busch in the race.

After Tim Fedewa ran the 2002 season-opener in the truck, and with the now 17-year-old Busch not able to compete, the team did not run for the rest of the year due to lack of sponsorship.

Carl Edwards (2003–2004)
The truck returned in 2003 with Carl Edwards driving; although the United States Navy was the truck's original sponsor, they left the team midway through the year and Edwards ran largely unsponsored until Superchips came on to sponsor him. Edwards won three races and the Rookie of the Year title. He repeated his win total in 2004 and moved up to fourth in points, and following Jeff Burton's departure from Roush Racing he began splitting time between the Truck Series and the Nextel Cup Series.

Ricky Craven (2005)
When Edwards moved up to Nextel Cup for 2005, Roush hired a former Cup driver, Ricky Craven, to take his place. Despite posting seven top tens and winning at Martinsville, Roush and Craven announced they would not be back together in 2006.

Erik Darnell (2006–2008)
Erik Darnell piloted the No. 99 truck full-time in 2006 with at first Woolrich, but eventually Northern Tool and Equipment as sponsor to a 2006 Rookie of the Year title. 2007 brought about Darnell's first win at Kansas, but inconsistency left the team 12th in points at season's end. In 2008, Darnell captured one win at Michigan by only .005 seconds over eventual champion Johnny Benson and ended the season fourth in the standings. This team was shut down after the 2008 season, as the team was being moved up for a part-time schedule in the Nationwide Series.

Truck No. 99 results

ARCA Re/Max Series
Todd Kluever drove the No. 60 car in 2005 at Daytona, crashing out of the event. The next year, Danny O'Quinn Jr. drove a renumbered No. 39 car at Daytona, finishing 37th after completing less than half the laps.

Car No. 99 history
In 2007, Erik Darnell drove the No. 99 in three races, finishing second at Kansas and winning at Kentucky and Michigan. Travis Kvapil drove one race at Pocono, failing to finish, and Colin Braun drove three races later in the year, collecting three top tens. For 2008, Ricky Stenhouse Jr. drove an Aflac sponsored No. 99 to compete in the championship, winning two races at Kentucky and Pocono and collecting ten top-fives. During the last race at Toledo Speedway, he and Scott Speed battled for the championship, and Stenhouse ran Speed up the track causing a caution. Speed later wrecked in retaliation, knocking Stenhouse and himself out of the race. Justin Allgaier won the championship, while Stenhouse and Speed slipped to 4th and 5th in the final standings.

ARCA Series results

Partnerships

Roush-Yates Engines

Perhaps Roush Racing's most famous partnership is with the now defunct-Yates Racing, a longtime rival Ford team. In 2004, the two teams announced a program to combine their engine divisions, now known as Roush-Yates Engines (RYE), a move which greatly improved the power of both organizations' engines. By 2006, most Ford teams were using the Roush-Yates engines, including long-time Ford team and Roush affiliate Wood Brothers Racing (then Wood Brothers/JTG Racing). Current Roush-Yates clients include Team Penske (TP), Wood Brothers Racing (WBR), Stewart-Haas Racing (SHR), Front Row Motorsports (FRM), Live Fast Motorsports (LFM), and Rick Ware Racing (RWR).

Roush Fenway also has technical alliances with Front Row Motorsports, providing engines, chassis, and bodies as well as technical support. Roush also provided heavy technical support to Yates Racing from 2008 to the team's closure at the end of 2009, when it merged with Richard Petty Motorsports. As of 2017, Roush supplies engines and chassis to 13 Cup teams.

Wood Brothers Racing
The first technical alliance between Roush Racing and another organization was with Wood Brothers Racing, another longtime Ford team and the oldest active team in the sport. The Wood Brothers alliance began in mid-2000, after Roush had provided the team with engines the previous two seasons. The relationship later expanded when the team fielded Roush development driver Trevor Bayne from late-2010 to 2014. It would end after that season, with the Wood Brothers currently receiving equipment and support (other than engines) from Team Penske.

Tim Brown partnership
In 2005, nine-time Pro Bowl NFL wide receiver Tim Brown announced that he intended to start his own NASCAR team, most likely No. 81, and receive equipment from Roush Racing. Brown also stated that he will let Roush select his driver. The series the team will run will depend on how much sponsorship money the team gets.

Brown had said that his team will most likely not enter NASCAR until 2007, but as of October 2006, no further announcements have been made about the status of this partnership.

No Fear Racing

In 2006, SoBe No Fear energy drink announced that it was forming a new team to run full-time in 2007, with a car driven by road racing specialist Boris Said.  It was also announced that this new team would be affiliated with Roush Racing.  This allows Roush to sell No Fear Racing cars and equipment, as well as help them with engineering.  In return, Said is tutoring Roush's younger drivers on road course racing. The team began running a limited schedule with the Sonoma road course in 2006.

Robby Gordon

Starting with the 2007 season, Robby Gordon switched from Chevrolet to Ford vehicles after signing a contract with Ford Racing. He leased engines from the Roush/Yates engine program through the 2007 season, until he switched to Gillett Evernham engines and a Dodge Charger.

Creation of Roush Fenway Racing
On February 14, 2007, the Fenway Sports Group, owner of the Boston Red Sox baseball team, purchased 50% of Roush Racing to create a new corporate entity, Roush Fenway Racing.

Mike Dee, president of the Fenway Sports Group was quoted as saying, "Although there have been many instances of cross-ownership in the world of professional sports, this partnership marks the first time that owners of a professional franchise in one of the four major leagues have crossed over into the world of NASCAR."

Aerospace industry 
Roush became involved in the aerospace industry in the 2010s.  In April 2015, United Launch Alliance announced that they were contracting with Roush Racing to produce the lightweight internal combustion engine to be used to power the long-life on orbit system of the Advanced Cryogenic Evolved Stage to be flown in the 2020s as the second stage of the Vulcan launch vehicle.

The Gong Show

For many years, Roush Racing recruited its developmental drivers through an elimination-style of testing entitled The Gong Show. The first competition was held in 1985 for Roush's road racing program. The first combine for the stock car program was held in 1999. The process would begin when Roush solicited applications from thousands of drivers from all levels of racing. They would then be put through a series of tests, gauging not only driving skills but also public relations talent and personality traits. Eventually, the field would be narrowed down to an elite group who are allowed to race Roush vehicles, often Truck Series vehicles, in an attempt to assess racecraft. Those with the fastest times progress, and ultimately the best drivers are awarded a contract to drive for Roush in the Truck Series or Busch Series (now Xfinity Series). In 2005, the process was documented in the Discovery Channel television series Roush Racing: Driver X, which followed the stories of those involved in the 2005 Gong Show. Winners of the program include Kurt Busch, Carl Edwards and David Ragan.

The term "Gong Show" comes from the 1970s talent show spoof "The Gong Show."

See also
 Roush Performance
 Ford Racing

References

Sources
NASCAR.com Driver list
Racing-Reference.info

External links

 

American auto racing teams
Auto racing teams established in 1988
Companies based in North Carolina
NASCAR teams
Fenway Sports Group